Hempriggs Castle was a 15th-century castle, about  north-east of Forres, Moray, Scotland, and about  south of Burghead. The castle belonged to the Dunbars, who also owned property in Caithness. It is thought that the castle was built during the reign of James II of Scotland. It was demolished around 1830, the stones being used in constructing the farmsteading. No trace of the castle remains.

See also
Castles in Great Britain and Ireland
List of castles in Scotland

References

Castles in Moray
Buildings and structures demolished in the 1830s
Demolished buildings and structures in Scotland